Russell Loines Award for Poetry was a poetry award by the American Academy of Arts and Letters of $1000.

References

Awards established in 1931
American poetry awards
Awards of the American Academy of Arts and Letters